Sylvestre de Laval (15701616) was a French Catholic theologian.

Life and Works 

He lived most of life in Paris, France. He was the author of two controversial books.  He was a teacher of theology and philosophy. He did a lot of missionary work as well.

Bibliography 

 Correction Chrestienne errors and ungodliness Minister Vignier and real participation of the body and blood of Jesus Christ , Blois , 1608 , 8vo, with Frontispiece Leu Th 3 .;
 The Righteous greatness of the Roman church, against the impiety of those who call the antichrist pope singullièrement against the Minister Vignier ... Poitiers: A. Mesnier, 1611 , 4 volumes and tables 1 vol. 4to ̊, cuffs, as gr 4 .

References 

1570 births
1616 deaths
16th-century French people
Writers from Paris
17th-century French Catholic theologians
17th-century French male writers